Edward Allen Carter Jr. (May 26, 1916 – January 30, 1963) was a United States Army sergeant first class who was wounded in action during World War II. He was posthumously awarded the Medal of Honor, the nation's highest military decoration for valor, for his actions on March 23, 1945, near Speyer, Germany.

Carter and six other black Americans who served in World War II were awarded the Medal of Honor on January 12, 1997. The seven recipients are the first and only black American soldiers to be awarded the Medal of Honor for World War II.

Early years 
Carter was born in Los Angeles, California, in 1916. He was the son of missionary parents; an African American father and an East Indian mother. Carter grew up in India and then moved to Shanghai, China. He was fluent in 4 languages: English, Hindi, German and Mandarin.

Military career

China and Spain 
While in Shanghai in 1932, Carter ran away from home and joined the National Revolutionary Army fighting against the invading Japanese during the Shanghai Incident. After reaching the rank of Lieutenant, he had to leave when it was discovered that he lied about his age and he was actually 15 years old. He eventually made his way to Spain and joined the Abraham Lincoln Brigade, an American volunteer unit supporting the Spanish Republicans in their fight against the Nationalists during the Spanish Civil War.

World War II 
Carter had entered the U.S. Army on September 26, 1941. As a result of his previous combat experience, he stood out among the other recruits. In less than a year, he had achieved the rank of staff sergeant. Carter was part of the 56th Armored Infantry Battalion of the 12th Armored Division.

Provisional platoons of African-American troops were established in the wake of the Battle of the Bulge, which took place during the winter of 1944–1945. Black support and combat-support soldiers were allowed to volunteer for combat duty and were given brief training in small-unit tactics. Formed into provisional units, they were used to augment depleted divisions. Soldiers volunteering for this combat duty had to surrender their current rank.  When the provisional companies were set up Carter volunteered and went from staff sergeant to private.

On March 23, 1945, Carter, then a 28-year-old infantry staff sergeant, was riding on a tank when it was hit by a Panzerschreck. Dismounted, Carter led three soldiers across an open field. In the process, two of the men were killed and the other seriously wounded. Carter continued on alone and was wounded five times before being forced to take cover.

Eight German soldiers tried to capture him, but he killed six and captured the remaining two. He used the two as human shields from enemy fire as he recrossed the field. His prisoners provided valuable information on enemy troop dispositions for his unit. For this, he was awarded the Distinguished Service Cross on October 4, 1945, and later promoted to  sergeant first class.

Carter was refused re-enlistment in Army in 1949, due to allegations that he had communist contacts and allegiances, related to his affiliation with the Abraham Lincoln Brigade and a "Welcome Home Joe" dinner. He died of lung cancer—attributed to shrapnel remaining in his neck—on January 30, 1963. Carter was buried at Los Angeles National Cemetery and re-interred at Arlington National Cemetery in 1997.

Personal life 
He married Mildred Hoover in 1940 and together they had two sons, Edward III (born March 27, 1941) and William (born 1944).

Awards and decorations 
Carter's awards and decorations include:

, a Navy container ship of the Military Sealift Command, was named after Carter.

Medal of Honor 

In the early 1990s, it was determined that black soldiers had been denied consideration for the Medal of Honor in World War II on ground of their race. In 1993, the Army contracted Shaw University in Raleigh, North Carolina, to research and determine if there was racial disparity in the review process for recipients of the Medal of Honor. A study commissioned by the Army described systematic racial discrimination in the criteria for awarding decorations during World War II.

In 1996, after an exhaustive review of files, the study recommended that ten black Americans who served in World War II be awarded the Medal of Honor. In October of that year, Congress passed legislation that would allow the Medal of Honor to be passed to seven out of the ten former soldiers. The Medal of Honor was given to Carter's son, the descendants of the other five black Americans, and the only still-living recipient, Vernon Baker, on January 12, 1997. Out of the seven, six had their Distinguished Service Crosses revoked and upgraded.

Citation

See also 
 List of African-American Medal of Honor recipients
 List of Medal of Honor recipients for World War II
Medal of Honor (TV series), Carter is featured in Season 1, Episode 3

References

Footnotes

Sources

External links 

 
 

1916 births
1963 deaths
Abraham Lincoln Brigade members
African Americans in World War II
United States Army personnel of World War II
American people of Indian descent
American people of English descent
Deaths from lung cancer in California
Military personnel from California
Military personnel of the Republic of China in the Second Sino-Japanese War
People from Los Angeles
Recipients of the Distinguished Service Cross (United States)
United States Army Medal of Honor recipients
United States Army soldiers
World War II recipients of the Medal of Honor
Burials at Arlington National Cemetery
Burials at Los Angeles National Cemetery
African-American United States Army personnel